The 2013–14 season is Yuen Long District SA's 20th season in the Hong Kong First Division League, as well as their debut season after their promotion to the top-tier division in 2012–13 season. Yuen Long will compete in the First Division League, as well as to fight for victory in Senior Challenge Shield and FA Cup.

Starting from this season, the club is renamed as I-Sky Yuen Long due to sponsorship reasons.

Key events
 30 May 2013: Hong Kong midfielder Cheng King Ho joins the club from fellow First Division club Biu Chun Rangers for free.
 31 May 2013: Brazilian midfielder Gustavo Claudio da Silva joins the club from fellow First Division club Citizen for free.
 31 May 2013: Brazilian striker Sandro joins the club from fellow First Division club Citizen for free.
 3 June 2013: Montenegrin defender Čedomir Mijanović joins the club from fellow First Division club Yokohama FC Hong Kong for free.
 3 June 2013: Hong Kong defender Chueng Chi Yung joins the club from fellow First Division club Sunray Cave JC Sun Hei for free.
 3 June 2013: Hong Kong defender Yuen Tsun Nam joins the club on loan from fellow First Division club Sunray Cave JC Sun Hei until the end of the season.
 3 June 2013: Hong Kong midfielder Chow Ki joins the club from fellow First Division club Sun Pegasus Reserves for free.
 3 June 2013: Hong Kong international defender Chiu Chun Kit joins the club from fellow First Division club Citizen on loan until the end of the season.
 3 June 2013: Hong Kong goalkeeper Liu Fu Yuen joins the club from fellow First Division club Citizen for free.
 16 June 2013: Hong Kong midfielder Cheung Yu Sum joins the club from fellow First Division club Citizen for free.
 17 June 2013: Hong Kong midfielder Fung Kai Hong joins the club from fellow First Division club Sun Pegasus for free.
 17 June 2013: Unattached Brazilian midfielder Wellingsson de Souza joins the club for free.
 18 September 2013: Brazilian midfielder Rian Marques joins the club from fellow First Division club Biu Chun Rangers for an undisclosed fee.
 20 January 2014: Japanese midfielder Yuki Fujimoto joins the club on a free transfer.
 29 January 2014: Hong Kong goalkeeper Pang Tsz Kin joins the club from fellow First Division club Happy Valley for an undisclosed fee.

Players

Squad information

Source: Yuen Long District FC
Ordered by squad number.
LPLocal player; FPForeign player; APAsian player; NRNon-registered player.

Transfers

In

Out

Loan In

Loan out

Club

Coaching staff

Squad statistics

Overall Stats
{|class="wikitable" style="text-align: center;"
|-
!width="100"|
!width="60"|First Division
!width="60"|Senior Shield
!width="60"|FA Cup
!width="60"|Total Stats
|-
|align=left|Games played    ||  0  ||  0  || 0  || 0
|-
|align=left|Games won       ||  0  ||  0  || 0  || 0
|-
|align=left|Games drawn     ||  0  ||  0  || 0  || 0
|-
|align=left|Games lost      ||  0  ||  0  || 0  || 0
|-
|align=left|Goals for       ||  0  ||  0  || 0  || 0
|-
|align=left|Goals against   ||  0  ||  0  || 0  || 0
|- =
|align=left|Players used    ||  0  ||  0  || 0  || 01
|-
|align=left|Yellow cards    ||  0  ||  0  || 0  || 0
|-
|align=left|Red cards       ||  0  ||  0  || 0  || 0
|-

Players Used: Yuen Long has used a total of 0 different players in all competitions.

Squad Stats

Top scorers

Disciplinary record
Includes all competitive matches. Players listed below made at least one appearance for I-Sky Yuen Long first squad during the season.

Substitution Record
Includes all competitive matches.

Last updated: 15 December 2013

Captains

Competitions

Overall

First Division League

Classification

Results summary

Results by round

Matches

Pre-season friendlies

First Division League

Senior Shield

FA Cup

Notes

References

Yuen Long FC seasons
Yuen